The 2009 Tampere Open was a professional tennis tournament played on outdoor red clay courts. It was the twenty-eighth edition of the tournament which was part of the 2009 ATP Challenger Tour. It took place in Tampere, Finland between 27 July and 2 August 2009.

Singles entrants

Seeds

 Rankings are as of July 20, 2009.

Other entrants
The following players received wildcards into the singles main draw:
  Alexandros Jakupovic
  Henri Kontinen
  Micke Kontinen
  Henri Laaksonen

The following players received entry from the qualifying draw:
  Augustin Gensse
  Tim Goransson
  Sebastian Rieschick
  Andoni Vivanco-Guzmán

Champions

Singles

 Thiemo de Bakker def.  Peter Luczak, 6–4, 7–6(7)

Doubles

 Peter Luczak /  Yuri Schukin def.  Simone Vagnozzi /  Uros Vico, 6–1, 6–7(6), [10–4]

References
Official website
2010 Draws
ITF Search 

Tampere Open
Tampere Open